Let It Stink is an EP by the band of the Death Breath. The EP's title and album cover are a reference to The Beatles album Let It Be.

Track listing

 "Giving Head to the Dead" – 3:07 
 "His Protoplasmic Worship" – 4:36 
 "Maimed and Slaughtered" (Discharge) – 1:49 
 "Dead But Walking" – 4:03
 "Lycanthropy" (G.B.H.) – 2:29
 "Sacrifice " (Bathory) – 3:51
 "Twisted In Distaste" – 5:36

Credits 
 Robert Pehrsson – Guitar and Vocals on tracks 2,3,4 and 6
 Nicke Andersson – Drums, guitars and bass

Guests 
 Scott Carlson – Vocals on tracks 1 and 5
 Erik Sahlstrom – Vocals on 7
 Michael Borg – Audio engineering, audio mixing

References 

2007 EPs
Death Breath albums
Relapse Records EPs